Neethikkupin Paasam is a 1963 Indian Tamil-language legal drama film, directed by M. A. Thirumugam and produced by Sandow M. M. A. Chinnappa Thevar. The film stars M. G. Ramachandran, B. Saroja Devi and M. R. Radha. It was released on 15 August 1963. The film was remade in Telugu as Thandri Kodukula Challenge.

Plot
Gopal is an honest lawyer who prioritizes law and order over family and emotions. He once saved Sivasamy from a false petition filed against him by Muniyandi without charging any fees and being an eyewitness. He meets a simple village girl named Gowri and falls in love with her, which leads him to reject his cousins Jaya and Prema. Jaya dies by jumping from upstairs following his rejection. After this incident, Gopal's father decides that Gopal's marriage will be arranged based on his wishes, but his mother opposes it.

Eventually, Gopal and Gowri get separated but later reunite. However, trouble arises in the form of Muthayya, Gowri's uncle, who sets his sights on her. Gowri's father, Sivasamy, initially accepts Muthayya's proposal but later rejects it upon learning of Gopal and Gowri's relationship. He also informs Gopal's parents about it, with his father accepting and his mother rejecting the relationship. Gopal's mother even goes to Gowri's house and threatens her.

Meanwhile, Muthayya joins forces with Muniyandi, Sivasamy's rival, to get his consent for marrying Gowri. Sivasamy opposes it, and to marry Gowri, Muthayya murders Sivasamy with the help of Muniyandi. Gopal's mother, who is on her way home, is framed for the murder, leading to her arrest by her husband, who also files the case against her.

Gopal's brother, Ramu, takes on the case as a prosecutor due to their father's wishes. Only Gopal stands up for his mother in court and argues against his own father and brother. After several court hearings, Gopal and Gowri discover that Muthayya is the real murderer, with the help of a CID officer who is disguised as a blind beggar. They also discover that Muthayya and Muniyandi are involved in illegal business. With the help of the police, Gopal presents them in court.

After some arguments between Gopal and Ramu, the CID officer provides an eyewitness account. The judge makes the following judgment: since Muthayya and Muniyandi are the real culprits, they are sentenced to imprisonment, and Gopal's mother is released. Since they are involved in illegal business, they are punished for that as well. The judge also praises Gopal's family for their commitment to the law and orders and mentions them as the family with a policy of law first, affection next. Finally, the family unites, and Gopal marries Gowri.

Cast 
 M. G. Ramachandran as Gopal Chandrasekar
 B. Saroja Devi as Gowri
 M. R. Radha as Sivasamy
 S. V. Ranga Rao as Chandrasekar
 P. Kannamba as Saraswathi
 M. N. Nambiar as Muthaiya
 S. A. Ashokan as Ramu Chandrasekar
 Sandow M. M. A. Chinnappa Thevar as Muniyandi, Muthaiya's henchman
 Senthamarai as Blind man / Secret agent
 G. Sakunthala as Janaki
 S. M. Thirupathisamy
 B. V. Radha  as Jaya
 Sasirekha as Prema

Soundtrack 
The music was composed by K. V. Mahadevan, with lyrics by Kannadasan.

Release and reception 
Neethikkupin Paasam was released on 15 August 1963, and distributed by Emgeeyar Pictures. Kumudam gave the film a negative review, playing on its title by saying "நீதிக்­குப் பின் பாசம் பாதிக்­குப் பின் மோசம்" (Neethikkupin Paasam is bad in the latter half). Similar comments were made by Kanthan of Kalki. T. M. Ramachandran of Sport and Pastime, however, reviewed the film more positively, praising the performances of Ramachandran and Saroja Devi.

References

External links 
 

1960s legal drama films
1960s Tamil-language films
1963 films
Films directed by M. A. Thirumugam
Films scored by K. V. Mahadevan
Indian black-and-white films
Indian legal drama films
Tamil films remade in other languages